Tobermore United Football Club is an intermediate, Northern Irish football club playing in the NIFL Premier Intermediate League.

History
The club, founded in 1965, is based in Tobermore, near Magherafelt, County Londonderry and currently plays its home matches at Fortwilliam Park. Club colours are red and black. The current manager is Adrian Whiteside.

Tobermore United is the only football club in Northern Ireland that George Best ever played competitively for. However, it was only for one match, on 11 February 1984, after many years of his decline, and Tobermore lost 7–0 to Ballymena.

The club has an extensive and highly popular youth development scheme which has led to it being awarded official Football Development Centre (FDC) status by the IFA. It currently has teams at under-11, under-12, under-14 and under-16 level.

In the 2010–11 season, the club gained promotion to IFA Championship 1 by finishing 2nd in IFA Championship 2, but were relegated again two-years later.

Following the curtailed 2019–20 Premier Intermediate League season, Tobermore finished 11th and technically bottom of the league however weren’t relegated due to no appropriate promotion candidates, and given the league had already lost Lurgan Celtic who had withdrawn.

Current squad

Honours

Senior honours
North West Senior Cup: 2
1989–90, 2006–07

Intermediate honours
IFA Intermediate League Second Division: 1
2004–05
Craig Memorial Cup: 6
1980-81, 1988–89, 1989–90, 1997–98, 2005–06, 2009–10
Northern Ireland Intermediate League: 3
1978–79, 1981–82, 1982–83
Northern Ireland Intermediate League Cup: 2
1978–79, 1981–82
North West Intermediate Cup Winners: 2
1989–90, 2005–06

References

External links
 NIFL Home Page (Fixtures, Results and Tables of all NIFL Leagues)
 Tobermore United (Fixtures & Results)
 Tobermore United (Club Information)

 
Association football clubs established in 1965
Association football clubs in Northern Ireland
Association football clubs in County Londonderry
1965 establishments in Northern Ireland
NIFL Premier Intermediate League clubs